The term Little Cambodia (or Cambodia Town) refers to an ethnic enclave of people from the country of Cambodia.

Cambodian presence in the West traces back to the French colonisation of Cambodia from the 1860s to mid-1950s, in which a number of Cambodians migrated to France as students or workers. This group formed the basis of the Cambodian population in France.

While some were able to flee to France shortly after the Khmer Rouge took over in 1975, most Cambodians left their country after the regime in the 1980s, with most arriving in the United States (specifically to Long Beach, California; Lowell, Massachusetts and the New York City borough of the Bronx), as well as Australia (specifically Sydney, Melbourne and Perth).

Locations

United States

Bronx, New York
In the Bronx, Little Cambodia is known for its "... spicy Cambodian noodle soup made with beef, shrimp and fish balls." The Cambodian population was mainly concentrated in the neighbourhoods of Fordham, University Heights and Bronx Park East areas. The Cambodian population in the Bronx and New York City has declined since the 1980s, as many of the Cambodian immigrants moved to California, Massachusetts and Texas.

Chamblee, Georgia
 Buford Highway near Atlanta, Georgia, nicknamed "Chambodia" for the city is named Chamblee, Georgia. This is a common misnomer. There are actually very few Khmer businesses in the Buford Highway area. It is predominantly Chinese, Vietnamese, and Mexican.

Long Beach, California
Cambodia Town, Long Beach, California "... is a neighborhood in Long Beach's East Side centered on Anaheim Street between Atlantic and Junipero."  The community has been around since 1959 which was made up of students from the nearby universities such as the University of Southern California, UCLA, and California State University at Los Angeles, to name a few.

Lowell, Massachusetts
 A business community in the Lower Highlands neighborhood of Lowell, Massachusetts

White Center, Washington
 White Center, a suburb of Seattle, has a significant Cambodian-American community (642 Cambodian-Americans; 4.8% of the city's population). There are several Cambodian grocery stores, and Cambodian New Year is celebrated in this city.

France

Lognes
With Asians comprising over 40% of the city's population, the Parisian suburb of Lognes has the highest proportion of Asians in France of any city in the country. Vietnamese, Laotian and Cambodian business districts and community services are found throughout the commune. Cambodian community organisations, Buddhist temples and businesses are scattered around Lognes, and Cambodians form the largest Asian group in the city.

References

Cambodian diaspora
Ethnic enclaves in the United States